Killing Aurora is a novel by Helen Barnes about a girl with anorexia.  It was published in 1999 by Penguin Books.

Plot summary

The novel contains two central characters, both fourteen years of age: the first, Aurora Thorpe (rabbit queen), has been forced by her overprotective mother and stepfather to attend the prestigious St Dymphna's Non-Denominational Ladies' College. The second, also attending St Dymphna's, is Web Richardson (rabbit king), an outcast from a single parent family. Aurora and Web share a prickly connection, despite Aurora's reluctance to be associated with the terribly unpopular Web.

In an abruptly unfamiliar environment, and under the pressure of family and social expectations, Aurora becomes increasingly concerned with losing weight as a means of achieving the acceptance of her peers and living up to her own rigorous standards. Meanwhile, Web endures life without a mother, having only the scant guidance of her timid father, overbearing aunt, bitter grandfather and volatile older sister to rely on. Web desperately tries to stop Aurora from "disappearing", at the same time struggling with her mother's absence and the need for a friend.

There are many references throughout the book to suggest that the school "St Dymphna's" is in fact the selective Mac.Robertson Girls' High School in Melbourne. This is the school that the author attended.

Release details
1999, UK, Puffin Books , Pub date 1 May 1999, paperback
1999, UK, Penguin Books , Pub date ? ? 1999, paperback

1999 Australian novels
Australian young adult novels
Novels about eating disorders